Irish Society or The Irish Society may refer to:
 :Category:Society of Ireland; in particular:
 Demographics of Ireland (disambiguation)
 Culture of Ireland
 The Irish Society for Promoting the Education of the Native Irish through the Medium of Their Own Language (1818–1914) Protestant missionary society
 The Honourable The Irish Society, London society set up in 1613 for the plantation of County Londonderry
 The Society of United Irishmen 1790s radical organisation
 Benevolent Irish Society, Newfoundland philanthropic organisation